Douglas Geoffrey McGrath (February 2, 1958 – November 3, 2022) was an American screenwriter, film director, and actor. He received various accolades, including nominations for an Academy Award, BAFTA Award, Tony Award, and Primetime Emmy Award.

McGrath started his career as a writer for Saturday Night Live from 1980 to 1981. He co-wrote with Woody Allen the film Bullets Over Broadway (1994), for which he received a nomination for the Academy Award for Best Original Screenplay as well as BAFTA and Writers Guild of America Award nominations. He then directed such films as Emma (1996), Company Man (2000), Nicholas Nickleby (2002), and Infamous (2006). He also appeared in such films as Quiz Show (1994), The Daytrippers (1996), Happiness (1998), The Insider (1999), and Michael Clayton (2007).

He also made appearances in television including a recurring role as Principal Toby Cook in Lena Dunham's HBO series Girls from 2015 to 2016. He also appeared in the Amazon Prime comedy series Crisis in Six Scenes (2016), and the Netflix western limited series Godless (2017).

McGrath received a Tony Award for Best Book of a Musical nomination for the Broadway musical Beautiful: The Carole King Musical in 2014. He also directed the HBO documentaries His Way (2011), and Becoming Mike Nichols (2016). He wrote political commentary, such as "The Flapjack File", a column for The New Republic, as well as articles for The New Yorker, The New York Times, and Vanity Fair.

Early life and education 
Doug McGrath is the son of Beatrice and R. Searle McGrath, an independent oil producer from Midland, Texas. He is an alumnus of Trinity School of Midland, The Choate School, and Princeton University.  At Princeton, he was a member of the Princeton Triangle Club and joined its board of directors after graduation.

Career
McGrath started his career as a writer on the sixth season of Saturday Night Live from 1980 to 1981. Fellow writers that season included Brian Doyle-Murray, Mason Williams, and Jean Doumanian. The season was universally panned. McGrath wrote an episode of L.A. Law entitled, "One Rat, One Ranger". In 1993 he wrote the screenplay for the 1993 remake of Born Yesterday starring Melanie Griffith, John Goodman, and Don Johnson. The film received mixed reviews with many comparing it to the 1950 film of the same name.

The following year he started the first of his many collaborations with Woody Allen, co-writing his musical comedy film Bullets over Broadway starring John Cusack, Dianne Wiest, Chazz Palminteri, and Jim Broadbent. Film critic Janet Maslin of The New York Times described the film as "a bright, energetic, sometimes side-splitting comedy with vital matters on its mind, precisely the kind of sharp-edged farce [Allen] has always done best." McGrath along with Allen received the nomination for the Academy Award for Best Original Screenplay. They also received BAFTA Award, Independent Spirit Award, and Writers Guild of America Award nominations. He continued his relationship with Allen acting in several of his films including Celebrity (1998), Small Time Crooks (2000), Hollywood Ending (2002), Café Society (2016), and Rifkin's Festival (2020).

He soon gained further success as both a writer and director of the film adaptation of Jane Austen's novel, Emma (1996) starring Gwyneth Paltrow. The film gained critical acclaim and McGrath received a Writers Guild of America Award nomination. During this time he also played supporting roles in critically acclaimed films such as Robert Redford's Quiz Show (1994), Greg Mottola's The Daytrippers (1996), Todd Solondz's Happiness (1998), and Michael Mann's The Insider (1999).

McGrath continued his career as a director with the comedy Company Man (2000) starring himself, Sigourney Weaver, John Turturro, and Alan Cumming. He soon returned to directing with the film adaptation of Charles Dickens' Nicholas Nickleby (2002) starring Jamie Bell, Anne Hathaway, Nathan Lane, Timothy Spall, Jim Broadbent, and Christopher Plummer. Famed film critic Roger Ebert praised McGrath for his adaptation writing, "The movie is jolly and exciting and brimming with life, and wonderfully well-acted." He then directed the film Infamous focusing on the life of Truman Capote starring Toby Jones. The film instantly drew comparisons to the Bennett Miller film Capote (2005) starring Philip Seymour Hoffman which was released the year previously. In his review in The New York Times, A.O. Scott called the film "well worth your attention. It is quick-witted, stylish and well acted… warmer and more tender, if also a bit thinner and showier, than Capote… it is in the end more touching than troubling." During this time he appeared in the dramas Michael Clayton (2007), and Solitary Man (2009).

McGrath was also known for his documentaries including His Way which profiled film producer and talent manager Jerry Weintraub and for Becoming Mike Nichols (2016), both of which were produced by HBO. In 2011 he directed his final narrative feature film the romantic comedy I Don't Know How She Does It starring Sarah Jessica Parker, Pierce Brosnan, Christina Hendricks, Olivia Munn, and Kelsey Grammer. The film received mixed reviews and is considered a box office bomb. During this time he had a recurring role as Principal Toby Cook in Lena Dunham's HBO series Girls from 2015 t 2016. His final on television roles were in Woody Allen's Amazon Prime series Crisis in Six Scenes (2016) and in the Netflix western limited series Godless (2017).

In 2014, McGrath wrote the book for the Broadway musical Beautiful: The Carole King Musical. The musical received critical acclaim and McGrath earned a Tony Award for Best Book of a Musical nomination as well Drama Desk Award and Outer Critics Circle Award nominations. In 2022, he wrote his one-man show, Everything's Fine which was directed by John Lithgow and premiered Off-Broadway at the DR2 Theatre. McGrath suffered a heart attack and died during the production's run.

Personal life and death 
In 1995, McGrath married Jane Read Martin, a former assistant of Woody Allen's and sister of author Ann M. Martin. Together they had one son.

McGrath died of a heart attack at his office in Manhattan on November 3, 2022, at the age of 64. He had been performing Off-Broadway in his solo autobiographical show Everything's Fine directed by John Lithgow at the Daryl Roth Theatre, a run which was cut short by his death.

Partial filmography

Writer
Saturday Night Live (12 episodes, 1980–1981)
L.A. Law (1 episode: "One Rat, One Ranger", 1989)
Born Yesterday (1993)
Bullets over Broadway (1994) (co-written with Woody Allen)
Emma (1996)
Company Man (2000)
Nicholas Nickleby (2002)
Infamous (2006)
Checkers (2012) (play about young Richard Nixon)
Beautiful: The Carole King Musical (2014) (musical book)

Actor
Quiz Show (1994) – Snodgrass
The Daytrippers (1996) – Chap
 aka En route vers Manhattan
Prix Fixe (1997) – Bob Waterman
Happiness (1998) – Tom
Celebrity (1998) – Bill Gaines
The Insider (1999) – Private Investigator
Company Man (2000) – Alan Quimp
Small Time Crooks (2000) – Frenchy's Lawyer
Hollywood Ending (2002) – Barbecue Guest
Michael Clayton (2007) – Jeff Gaffney
Solitary Man (2009) – Dean Edward Gitleson
Girls (2015-2016) - Principal Toby Cook
Café Society (2016) – Norman
Crisis in Six Scenes (2016) - Doug
Godless (2017) - Edward Solomon
Rifkin's Festival (2020) – Gil Brenner

Director
Emma (1996)
Company Man (2000)
Nicholas Nickleby (2002)
Infamous (2006)
His Way (2011)
I Don't Know How She Does It (2011)
Becoming Mike Nichols (2016)

Awards and nominations

Bibliography

Books

Essays and reporting

References

External links

1958 births
2022 deaths
20th-century American male actors
20th-century American male writers
21st-century American dramatists and playwrights
21st-century American male actors
21st-century American male writers
American male film actors
American male screenwriters
American male non-fiction writers
American political writers
Film directors from Texas
Male actors from Texas
People from Midland, Texas
Princeton University alumni
Screenwriters from Texas